Ike Isaacs may refer to:

 Ike Isaacs (guitarist) (1919–1996), Burmese-British jazz guitarist
 Ike Isaacs (bassist) (1923–1981), American jazz bassist